Cameron Duke (born February 13, 2001) is an American professional soccer player who plays as a midfielder for Major League Soccer club Sporting Kansas City.

Club career
Born in Overland Park, Kansas, Duke joined the youth academy at Sporting Kansas City in 2012. He is the younger brother of former Sporting Kansas City, Swope Park Rangers, and Kansas City Comets midfielder Christian Duke, who would later join the SKC academy as a coach. He proceeded to rise up through the club ranks before signing a professional homegrown player deal with the Sporting Kansas City first team on July 18, 2019. Prior to signing with the club, Duke had committed to playing college soccer with the Duke Blue Devils but decided to turn professional instead.

On July 30, 2020, Duke made his professional debut for Sporting Kansas City during the MLS is Back Tournament against the Philadelphia Union. He came on as an 84th-minute substitute as Sporting Kansas City were defeated 3–1.

International career
Duke earned his first call-up to the United States under-14 side in 2013. On February 9, 2018, Duke made his debut for the under-18s against Costa Rica, starting in a 2–1 victory.

Career statistics

Club

References

External links
 Profile at Sporting Kansas City

2001 births
Living people
Sportspeople from the Kansas City metropolitan area
American soccer players
Association football midfielders
Sporting Kansas City players
Sporting Kansas City II players
Major League Soccer players
MLS Next Pro players
Soccer players from Kansas
United States men's youth international soccer players
USL Championship players